Jean Overton Fuller (7 March 1915 – 8 April 2009) was a British author best known for her book Madeleine, the story of Noor Inayat Khan, an Allied SOE agent during the Second World War.

Biography
Fuller was born in England on 7 March 1915, the posthumous and only child of an Indian Army officer. Brought up to think for herself by her mother, who was an artist, and a grandfather who was a retired Army doctor she early developed a wide field of interests. Following a short-lived career as a repertory actress she studied phonetics, linguistics and astronomy, and graduated with honours from the University of London.  Later, in 1947-8, she studied at the Académie Julian in Paris. In the 1930s she became a member of the poetry circle of Victor Benjamin Neuburg, whose biography she wrote.

Fuller was a friend of the Inayat Khan family. During the Second World War, she was employed by the British Postal Censorship Office in London. At the end of hostilities, she travelled extensively throughout Europe, interviewing various people connected with Noor's life.  The resultant publication, Madeleine, published by Victor Gollancz Ltd. in 1952, was re-published in 1988 by East-West Publications in Rotterdam. This updated version contains some chapters that were removed from the original manuscript, such as an in-depth exploration of Tipu Sultan, Noor's ancestor.  Following the book's publication, Fuller continued extensive research into the history of the wartime SOE French networks, interviewing many of the people involved – British and French, as well as Germans – in order to discover who was responsible for betraying Noor and her fellow agents. Her results were published in the 1958 book Double Webs (Putnam & Co).  Until the publication of Shrabani Basu's Spy Princess: The Life of Noor Inayat Khan (Sutton Publishing, 2006), Fuller's book was considered to be the definitive biography of Noor Inayat Khan.

In 1970 Fuller founded the publishing firm Fuller d'Arch Smith together with Timothy d'Arch Smith. The company employed the poet and writer Martin Booth as Poetry Editor. In 1974 Booth was instrumental in finding Fuller a house in Wymington, which became the company's new registered office. Prior to this she had been living in a flat in Whitfield Street, North Soho.

Fuller also wrote several other biographies, notably of Percy Bysshe Shelley, Algernon Charles Swinburne, Sir Francis Bacon, Victor Neuburg and a book detailing her theory of Jack the Ripper's true identity as Walter Richard Sickert, an English painter.  Jean Overton Fuller's memoirs were published in 2007 by Michael Russell, Wilby, Norwich under the title Driven To It, An Autobiography.

She died in Kettering on 8 April 2009 at the age of 94.

Bibliography
Madeleine, 1952, Victor Gollancz.
The Starr Affair, 1954, Victor Gollancz.
Double Webs, 1958, Putnam & Co.
Double Agent?, Pan Books Ltd, 1961.
The Magical Dilemma of Victor Neuburg, W.H. Allen, 1965.
Shelley, A Biography, Jonathan Cape, 1968.
Swinburne, A Critical Biography, Chatto & Windus, 1968.
Noor-un-nisa Inayat Khan (Madeleine) – reprinted with much additional material. East-West Publications in association with Barrie & Jenkins Ltd, London, 1971.
The German Penetration of SOE, William Kimber, 1975. 
Sir Francis Bacon: A Biography, East-West Publications, 1981; George Mann, 1994.
The Comte de Saint-Germain, East-West Publications, 1988.
Blavatsky and Her Teachers, Theosophical Publishing House, 1988.
Dericourt, The Chequered Spy, Michael Russell, 1989.
Cats and Other Immortals, Fuller d'Arch Smith, 1992.
The German Penetration of SOE, George Mann, 1996.
Espionage as a Fine Art by Henri Dericourt.  Translated from (previously unpublished) French original stories with an Introduction and Commentary, Michael Russell, 2002.
Sickert and the Ripper crimes: An investigation into the relationship between the Whitechapel murders of 1888 and the English tonal painter Walter Richard Sickert, Mandrake 1990, 2nd revised edition 2003.
Krishnamurti & The Wind, Theosophical Publishing House, 2003.
Driven To It, Michael Russell, 2007.

Archives 
Fuller's papers, including a significant collection of letters between herself and Martin Booth, are held at the Cadbury Research Library, University of Birmingham.

References

External links

Interview with Fuller about her biography of Sir Francis Bacon

1915 births
2009 deaths
20th-century biographers
British biographers
Helena Blavatsky biographers